The 9-centimeter band is a portion of the SHF (microwave) radio spectrum internationally allocated to amateur radio and amateur satellite use.  The amateur radio band, in ITU regions 1 and 2, is between 3,300 MHz and 3,500 MHz, and it is available only on a secondary basis.  The amateur satellite band is between 3,400 MHz and 3,410 MHz, and it is only available in ITU Regions 1 and 2, on a non-interference basis to other users (ITU footnote 5.282).  In Germany and Israel, the band 3,400 - 3,475 MHz is
also allocated to the amateur service on a secondary basis (ITU footnote 5.431).

In CEPT's "European Common Allocation Table", footnote EU17 allocates 3,400 MHz to 3,410 MHz to European amateurs on a secondary basis.

In the US, the FCC is recommending removing the amateur service from this band in order to make room for the 5G cellular system. There have been many objections to this proposal by Amateur Radio operators, including the ARRL.

History

List of notable frequencies 

3,400.1 MHz  IARU Region-1 Calling frequency and Global EME center of activity
3,456.1 MHz  IARU Region 2 Calling Frequency

Radio Astronomy 
3,332 - 3,339 MHz and 3345.8 - 3352.5 MHz are used by radio astronomers for spectral line observations.  Amateur stations voluntarily avoid using these frequencies when in geographic proximity to a radio telescope.  ITU footnote 5.149 encourages all radio communications in the band to take practical steps to avoid harmful interference to radio astronomy observations in those frequency ranges.

Countries with more restricted allocation

Sweden 

The Swedish Post and Telecom Authority (PTS) does not consider 3.4 GHz to be an amateur band, and has therefore auctioned it off for 5G test use.
Temporary permits in the 3400 - 3401 MHz range are currently issued however.

Spain 

The Ministerio de Economía y Empresa does not allow 3.4 GHz to be used by amateurs. Currently this band is used by WiMax in Spain and will be soon used by 5G services.

See also 
Amateur radio frequency allocations

References 

Amateur radio bands
Centimetric bands